This is an article about a royal couple. See also Mbanga, Cameroon.

Prince Mbanga was an African nobleman (Mwana' Mulena), the first Chief of Nalolo. His wife was named Notulu.

Biography
Mbanga was a son of the king Ngombala.

He succeeded on the resignation of his sister and established his capital at Ikalombwa.

His children were:
King Yubya
Chief Nakambe, 3rd Chief of Nalolo
Mwanamalia, 4th Chief of Nalolo
Yubya II, 2nd Chief of Nalolo
Prince Nakambe
King Mwanawina I of Barotseland

His sister was Chiefess Notulu of Libumbwandinde. He killed her son Mukwangwa.

He died at Ikatulamwa.

He was a grandfather of kings Mulambwa Santulu and Mwananyanda Liwale.

References

Royalty of Barotseland
19th-century African people